Thomas Zarlef Haynes (born July 14, 1952) is a retired American athlete, who mostly competed in the triple jump. He won a silver medal at the 1975 Pan American Games and placed fifth at the 1976 Olympics.

Domestically Haynes won the AAU triple jump championships outdoors in 1976 and indoors in 1975–77. In the long jump he won the AAU indoors title in 1977. Haynes was a career military officer, and after retiring from competitions became head track coach at the United States Military Academy.

References

1952 births
Living people
Athletes (track and field) at the 1976 Summer Olympics
American male triple jumpers
Olympic track and field athletes of the United States
Sportspeople from Nashville, Tennessee
Pan American Games medalists in athletics (track and field)
Pan American Games silver medalists for the United States
Athletes (track and field) at the 1975 Pan American Games
Medalists at the 1975 Pan American Games